Sicard is a surname of French and Italian origin. Notable people with the name include:

 Claude Sicard (1677–1726), French Jesuit priest and an early modern visitor to Egypt
 François-Léon Sicard (1862–1934), French sculptor
 Jean-Athanase Sicard (1872–1929), French neurologist and radiologist
 Jean Sicard (composer) (17th century–18th century), French singer and a composer, and father of Mme Sicard
 Mme Sicard (fl. 1678), French composer and daughter of Jean Sicard
 Maurice-Yvan Sicard (1910–2000), French journalist 
 Montgomery Sicard (1836–1900), Rear Admiral in the United States Navy
 Pedro Sicard (born 1968), Mexican actor
 Roch-Ambroise Cucurron Sicard (1742-1822), French abbé and instructor of deaf
 Romain Sicard (born 1988), French professional racing cyclist